The 2020 FIBA Men's Olympic Qualifying Tournament in Belgrade was one of four 2020 FIBA Men's Olympic Qualifying Tournaments. The tournament was held in Belgrade, Serbia. It was originally scheduled to take place from 23 to 28 June 2020 but was postponed due to the COVID-19 pandemic, to 29 June to 4 July 2021.

Following the 2016 FIBA World Olympic Qualifying Tournament, it was the second consecutive men's Olympic qualifying tournament held in Belgrade, Serbia.

Teams

New Zealand initially qualified for the Olympic Qualifying Tournament by virtue of the 2019 FIBA Basketball World Cup. On 26 February 2021, Basketball New Zealand announced that they would pull out of the tournament. On the same day, FIBA announced that they would be replaced by the Philippines as the next-best team from the Asia-Oceania region in FIBA World Rankings.

Senegal had been initially included in the Belgrade Tournament, but it has been forced to withdraw before the start due to several COVID-19 positive cases, and not being replaced by any team, lowering the number of participants to 5.

Venue

Squads

Preliminary round
All times are local (UTC+2).

Group A

Group B
Senegal did not participate in the Qualifying Tournament. On 28 June, they informed FIBA about COVID-19 related disruptions to their preparations in Germany. Afterwards, their scheduled games with Puerto Rico and Italy did not take place.

Therefore, in Group B only one match has been played between Puerto Rico and Italy: the winner of this game finished first of group B and faced the second placed team of Group A, the other team finished second of Group B and faced the first placed team of group A, in the semi-finals. In fact, FIBA did not considered Senegal as a participant and did not applied the Rule 20.2.1, which could have awarded Senegal's opponents the game with   score as 20 to 0 (Article 20 discusses the games lost by forfeit). FIBA indeed did not drew up any standings.

Final round

Semi-finals

Final

Final ranking

See also
 2020 FIBA Women's Olympic Qualifying Tournaments – Belgrade
 2020 FIBA Women's Olympic Qualifying Tournaments – Belgrade 2

References

External links
Official website
Tournament summary

Qualifying
2020–21 in Serbian basketball
International basketball competitions hosted by Serbia
International sports competitions in Belgrade
Impact of the COVID-19 pandemic on the 2020 Summer Olympics
June 2021 sports events in Serbia
July 2021 sports events in Serbia
Basketball in Belgrade